Nicolae Ovidiu Herea (born 26 March 1985) is a Romanian former footballer who played as an attacking midfielder and currently a manager.

Club career

Național București
Herea started his career at Național București, where he went through the youth systems. On 16 August 2003, he made his debut for the first team in the Divizia A in a game against FC Brașov. He helped his side reach the 2005–06 Romanian Cup final. He played four years for Național București, becoming a regular in his last two seasons with the team, before he left for Rapid București.

Rapid București
In 2007 Herea was transferred to Rapid București for €1 million. In November 2011, after two months of negotiations, Herea signed a new 4-year deal with Rapid București worth €1 million.
In 2012 Herea had offers from Italian sides A.C. Milan and A.S. Bari. Later on, in 2013 due to his great league performance he received the award "Romanian midfielder of the year" and he received another offer from Belgian top of the table team Standard Liège but he refused the offer. In April 2013 he scored an important 20 m free kick goal in the Romanian derby against FC Steaua București.

Sion
On 3 July 2013, he signed a three-year contract with Swiss side FC Sion.

International career
Between 2005 and 2007 Herea was a Romania U-21 international.

Herea made his national debut against Albania. He scored his first goal on 10 August 2011 against San Marino.

Statistics

Statistics accurate as of match played 26 September 2022

International

International goals

Trivia
His younger brother, Claudiu is also a footballer who currently plays for Metaloglobus București.

Honours

Club
Național București
Cupa României runner-up: 2005–06

Rapid București
Cupa României runner-up: 2011–12
Supercupa României: 2007

Sion
Swiss Cup: 2014–15

Viitorul Constanța
Supercupa României runner-up: 2017

References

External links
FC Sion profile 

1985 births
Living people
Footballers from Bucharest
Romanian footballers
Association football midfielders
Romania under-21 international footballers
Romania international footballers
Liga I players
Liga II players
Swiss Super League players
Super League Greece players
FC Progresul București players
FC Rapid București players
FC Sion players
Xanthi F.C. players
CS Pandurii Târgu Jiu players
CS Concordia Chiajna players
FC Viitorul Constanța players
CS Balotești players
FC Metaloglobus București players
Romanian expatriate footballers
Expatriate footballers in Switzerland
Expatriate footballers in Greece
Romanian expatriate sportspeople in Switzerland
Romanian expatriate sportspeople in Greece
Romanian football managers